The Borrowing (Control and Guarantees) Act 1946 was an Act of the Parliament of the United Kingdom that allowed HM Treasury to directly regulate borrowing within England and Wales and Scotland.

Act
The Act was given the Royal Assent on 12 July 1946. It made it necessary for all borrowing and raising of capital to be passed through HM Treasury, something first introduced by the Defence (Finance) Regulations. Section 1 of the Act allowed the Treasury to make orders regulating a company incorporated in Britain, the circulation of any offer of foreign securities in Britain, and the borrowing of more than £10,000 in a twelve-month period by any person. Section 2 allowed the Treasury to provide up to £50,000,000 each financial year to aid in the reconstruction of industry, countering the first section (which restricted private enterprise) by allowing the Treasury to support it directly.

The Radcliffe Committee found that "it was impossible to resist the broad conclusion that the [Act] had no significant impact on the pressure of total demand", and it was repealed by the Government Trading Act 1990.

References

Bibliography

United Kingdom Acts of Parliament 1946
Repealed United Kingdom Acts of Parliament